Hero is a 1980 board game published by Yaquinto Publications.

Gameplay
Hero, the first board game published by Yaquinto Publications., is an adventure game for 2-3 players that takes place in the maze of a twisting catacomb.

Each player is given a certain number of points with which to buy attributes for his hero: courage, comeliness, class, intelligence, and luck. The player can also choose to purchase armour, although that will count against his score at the end of the game. Each hero is then given a separate dungeon full of monster to explore. The first hero to reach the dungon exit wins the favour of  Princess Alysa and wins the game. If more than one hero reaches her during the same turn, the princess chooses the game winner based on the sum of each hero's ability scores (subtracting points if the hero wore armour), as well as points for treasure found and number of monsters killed.

Game components include a record-album shaped slipcover that opens to reveal the dungeon maps, and 150 counters.

Reception
In the August 1980 edition of The Space Gamer (Issue No. 30), Paul Manz found it a simple and enjoyable game, saying, "Hero has very high-quality components. It's a relaxing change from the other, involved, complicated fantasy adventure games, and for [the price] it's a great buy!" 

In the November 1980 edition of Dragon (Issue 43), Roberto Camino found the production values to be professional and the cover art "eye-catching". Despite the relatively high cost and lack of replayability over time, Camino recommended it for players new to the fantasy genre, saying, "Hero is an enjoyable game, due greatly to the device of the player who controls a hero as well as the monsters which are arrayed against an opposing hero. However, after a few playings, it becomes repetitive and a bit worn. What Hero is tailor made for is as an introductory game, utilizing the strong allure of superior graphics to entice a newcomer, showing him a good game and leaving him wanting more."

References

Board games introduced in 1980
Yaquinto Publications games